Street names in Iceland typically consist of two elements.  The first element is chosen in alphabetical order and conforming to the neighbourhood's theme (usually nature-related), and the second element is shared by all the streets in a neighbourhood.  The ending is also usually used to denote the neighbourhood; for example, a neighbourhood whose streets all end in –salir (hall) is called Salahverfi (neighbourhood of the halls).

Some older neighbourhoods do not follow the alphabetical order for streets. Exceptions do exist but the general rule is as above.

Common endings
In alphabetical order:
-ás (ridge)
-bakki (river bank)
-barð (embankment)
-baugur (ring)
-berg (rock)
-borg (town, butte)
-borgir (towns, buttes)
-braut (runway)
-brekka (escarpment)
-brún (embankment)
-bryggja (pier)
-búð (smallholding)
-byggð (settlement)
-bær (farm, town)
-endi (end)
-fell (mount)
-flöt (grassland)
-garðar (gardens)
-garður (garden)
-gata (street)
-geisli (ray)
-gerði (hedge)
-gil (canyon)
-grandi (isthmus)
-grund (ground)
-hagi (pasture)
-háls (ridge)
-heiði (heath)
-heimar (worlds)
-hjalli (terrace)
-hlíð (hillside)
-holt (hill, older meaning: forest)
-hólar (hillocks)
-hólmi (islet)
-hraun (lava)
-hús (houses)
-hvammur (grassy dell)
-hvarf (varve)
-hylur (pool)
-hæð (mount)
-höfði (cape)
-kinn (mountain slope)
-klöpp (rock)
-kór (quire)
-kvísl (river fork)
-land (land)
-leiti (hill)
-lind (spring)
-lundur (grove)
-melur (gravel bed)
-móar (moorland)
-múli (cape)
-mýri (marsh)
-nes (promontory)
-rimi (ridge)
-salir (hall)
-sel (lodge)
-síða (side)
-slóð (path)
-smári (clover)
-skjól (shelter)
-skógar (woods)
-stekkur (grove)
-stígur (trail)
-stræti (street)
-strönd (coast)
-teigur (small grassland)
-torg (square)
-tröð (path)
-tunga (tongue of land)
-tún (grassland), such as Borgartún
-vangur (open area)
-vegur (road), such as Laugavegur shopping street in the capital (not to be confused with Laugavegur the most popular hiking trail in South Iceland, considered one of the best in the world according to National Geographic) and Kaldidalsvegur in the Highlands of Iceland.
-vellir (fields)
-vogur (cove)
-vík (bay)
-vör (landing)

Example of neighbourhood naming
Salahverfi is a recent neighbourhood in Kópavogur. It has a main street, Salavegur (Halls Road), from which various culs-de-sac spread out, in an alphabetical order as follows:
Ársalir (River Halls)
Björtusalir (Brightness Halls)
Blásalir (Blue Halls)
Dynsalir (Thunder Halls)
Fensalir (Marsh Halls; this is the name of the home of Frigg)
Forsalir (Entry Halls)
Glósalir (Glow Halls)
Goðasalir (Halls of the Gods)
Hásalir (Height Halls)
Hlynsalir (Maple Halls)
Jórsalir (Yor Halls, old name for Jerusalem)
Jötunsalir (Jotun Halls)
Logasalir (Flame Halls)
Lómasalir (Loon Halls)
Miðsalir (Middle Halls)
Rjúpnasalir (Ptarmigan Halls)
Roðasalir (Redness Halls)
Skjólsalir (Shelter Halls)
Sólarsalir (Halls of the Sun)
Straumsalir (Current Halls)
Suðursalir (South Halls)

See also 
 List of roads in Iceland

References

Names of places in Europe
Road transport in Iceland
Icelandic language
Iceland